Resilient File System (ReFS), codenamed "Protogon", is a Microsoft proprietary file system introduced with Windows Server 2012 with the intent of becoming the "next generation" file system after NTFS.

ReFS was designed to overcome problems that had become significant over the years since NTFS was conceived, which are related to how data storage requirements had changed. These requirements arose from two major changes in storage systems and usage – the size of storage in use (large or massive arrays of multi-terabyte drives now being fairly common), and the need for continual reliability. As a result, the file system needs to be self-repairing (to prevent disk checking from being impractically slow or disruptive), along with abstraction or  virtualization between physical disks and  logical volumes.  

The key design advantages of ReFS include automatic integrity checking and data scrubbing, elimination of the need for running chkdsk, protection against data degradation, built-in handling of hard disk drive failure and redundancy, integration of RAID functionality, a switch to copy/allocate on write for data and metadata updates, handling of very long paths and filenames, and storage virtualization and  pooling, including almost arbitrarily sized logical volumes (unrelated to the physical sizes of the used drives).

Feature changes compared to NTFS

Major new features 
 Improved reliability for on-disk structures ReFS uses B+ trees for all on-disk structures, including all metadata and file data. Metadata and file data are organized into tables similar to a relational database. The file size, number of files in a folder, total volume size and number of folders in a volume are limited by 64-bit numbers; as a result, ReFS supports a maximum file size of 16 exbibytes (264−1 bytes), and a maximum volume size of 35 petabytes.

 Built-in resilience ReFS employs an allocation-on-write update strategy for metadata, which allocates new chunks for every update transaction and uses large IO batches. All ReFS metadata have 64-bit checksums which are stored independently. The file data can have an optional checksum in a separate "integrity stream", in which case the file update strategy also implements allocation-on-write for file data; this is controlled by a new "integrity" attribute applicable to both files and directories. If file data or metadata become corrupt, the file can be deleted without taking the whole volume offline for maintenance, and then be restored from the backup. As a result of built-in resiliency, administrators do not need to periodically run error-checking tools such as CHKDSK when using ReFS.

 Compatibility with existing APIs and technologies ReFS supports only a subset of NTFS features – and only Win32 APIs that are "widely adopted" – but does not require new system APIs, and most file system filters continue to work with ReFS volumes. ReFS supports many existing Windows and NTFS features such as BitLocker encryption, Access Control Lists, USN Journal, change notifications, symbolic links, junction points, mount points, reparse points, volume snapshots, file IDs, and oplock. ReFS seamlessly integrates with Storage Spaces, a storage virtualization layer that allows data mirroring and striping, as well as sharing storage pools between machines. ReFS resiliency features enhance the mirroring feature provided by Storage Spaces and can detect whether any mirrored copies of files become corrupt using a data scrubbing process, which periodically reads all mirror copies and verifies their checksums, then replaces bad copies with good ones.

Microsoft Windows and Windows Server include , a command-line utility that can be used to diagnose heavily damaged ReFS volumes, identify remaining files, and copy those files to another volume.

Removed features 
Some NTFS features are not implemented in ReFS. These include object IDs, 8.3 filename, NTFS compression, Encrypting File System (EFS), transactional NTFS, extended attributes, and disk quotas. Dynamic disks with mirrored or striped volumes are replaced with mirrored or striped storage pools provided by Storage Spaces; however, automated error-correction is only supported on mirrored spaces. Data deduplication was missing in early versions of ReFS. It was implemented in v3.2, debuting in Windows Server v1709.

Support for alternate data streams and hard links was initially not implemented in ReFS.  In Windows 8.1 64-bit and Server 2012 R2, the file system reacquired support for alternate data streams only, with lengths of up to 128K, and automatic correction of corruption when integrity streams are used on parity spaces. ReFS had initially been unsuitable for Microsoft SQL Server instance allocation due to the absence of alternate data streams.

Implementations 

ReFS was initially added to Windows Server 2012 only, with the aim of gradual migration to consumer systems in future versions; this was achieved as of Windows 8.1. The initial versions removed some NTFS features, such as disk quotas, alternate data streams, and extended attributes. Some of these were re-implemented in later versions of ReFS.

In early versions (2012–2013), ReFS was similar to or slightly faster than NTFS in most tests, but far slower when full integrity checking was enabled, a result attributed to the relative newness of ReFS.

The ability to create ReFS volumes was removed in Windows 10's 2017 Fall Creators Update for all editions except Enterprise and Pro for Workstations.

Starting with Windows Server 2022 and Windows 11 v21H2, its  bootx64.efi natively supports the ReFS boot feature, and allows the system to be installed and run in a special way on a volume formatted with ReFS v3. If it is a volume formatted with ReFS v1, it cannot be booted with ReFS.

The cluster size of a ReFS volume is either 4 KB or 64 KB.

Version history and compatibility 

ReFS has some different versions, with various degrees of compatibility between operating system versions. Aside for development versions of the filesystem, usually, later operating system versions can mount filesystems created with earlier OS versions (backwards compatibility). Some features may not be compatible with the feature set of the OS. The version, cluster size and other features of the filesystem can be queried with the command fsutil fsinfo refsinfo volumename.

 1.1: The original version, formatted by Windows Server 2012.
 1.2: Default version if formatted by Windows 8.1, Windows 10 v1507 to v1607, Windows Server 2012 R2, and when specified ReFSv1 on Windows Server 2016. Can use alternate data streams under Windows Server 2012 R2.
 2.2: Default version formatted by Windows 10 Preview build 10049 or earlier. Could not be mounted in 10061 and later.
 2.0: Default version formatted by Windows Server 2016 TP2 and TP3. Could not be mounted in Windows 10 Build 10130 and later, or Windows Server 2016 TP4 and later.
 3.0: Default version formatted by Windows Server 2016 TP4 and TP5.
 3.1: Default version formatted by Windows Server 2016 RTM.
 3.2: Default version formatted by Windows 10 v1703 and Windows Server Insider Preview build 16237. Can be formatted with Windows 10 Insider Preview 15002 or later (though only became the default somewhere between 15002 and 15019). Supports deduplication in the server version.
 3.3: Default version formatted by Windows 10 Enterprise v1709 (ReFS volume creation ability removed from all editions except Enterprise and Pro for Workstations starting with build 16226; read/write ability remains) and Windows Server version 1709 (starting with Windows 10 Enterprise Insider Preview build 16257 and Windows Server Insider Preview build 16257).
 3.4: Default version formatted by Windows 10 Pro for Workstations/Enterprise v1803 and newer, also server versions (including the long-time support version Windows Server 2019).
 3.5: Default version formatted by Windows 10 Enterprise Insider Preview (build 19536 or newer); adds support for hard links  (only on fresh formatted volume; not supported on volumes upgraded from previous versions).
 3.6: Default version formatted by Windows 10 Enterprise Insider Preview (build 21292 or newer) and Windows Server Insider Preview (build 20282 or newer)
 3.7: Default version formatted by Windows 10 Enterprise Insider Preview (build 21313 or newer) and Windows Server Insider Preview (build 20303 or newer). Also, the version used by Windows Server 2022 and Windows 11. Added File-Level Snapshot (only available in Server 2022)

Stability and known problems 

Issues identified or suggested for ReFS, when running on Storage Spaces, include:
 REFSutil does not work on 3.7 (Windows 2022)
 Adding thin-provisioned ReFS on top of Storage Spaces (according to a 2012 pre-release article) can fail in a non-graceful manner, in which the volume without warning becomes inaccessible or unmanageable. This can happen, for example, if the physical disks underlying a storage space became too full. Smallnetbuilder comments that, in such cases, recovery could be "prohibitive" as a "breakthrough in theory" is needed to identify storage space layouts and recover them, which is required before any ReFS recovery of file system contents can be started; therefore it recommends using backups as well.
 Thin-provisioned ReFS on top of Storage Spaces, occasionally if the ReFS partition is extended to the full size of the thin-volume. When later extending the thin-volume size the ReFS partition may fail to extend to the thin-volume size. Once it fails to extend the partition you can never again extend the partition, no matter how large you extend the thin-volume size too. The workaround is to never extend the ReFS partition to the full size of the thin-volume, always leave a few GB at the end of the volume unassigned, the problem still exist in Server 2022. It is thought that during the extension of the partition, it writes values into the partition table that corrupt the table when using the full size of the thin-volume, preventing any further expansions. That data is still intact and the ReFS partition works normally. A solution is to create a new volume and ReFS partition and copy out of the old ReFS and into the new ReFS requiring double storage during the copy before the old volume can be deleted.
 Thin-provisioned volume formatted with ReFS eventually expands the thin volume to the full size of the ReFS formatted size, nullifying the reason to use a thin volume on Windows 10. The more use the partition sees the quicker the volume is expanded, even if the data is mostly static. Less used drives still expand on Windows 10 but not at the same rate. When using an NTFS formatted volume on top of a thin volume does not experience the same expansion. For example, 4TB ReFS two-way mirror 99% static data(data logs) 1.11 TB used, data does not change once added, data added once a month, storage spaces used the entire 8TB of storage(should be around 2.2 TB used in storage spaces). Same storage space different thin volume formatted with ReFS, two-way mirror single data write, but data is used less frequently and added to less frequently 257GB of data, storage spaces using 7.77TB. thin volume NTFS partition, used in the same manner as the 257GB partition, but only using 601GB. 7-month window.
 Even when Storage Spaces is not thinly provisioned, ReFS may still be unable to dependably correct all file errors in some situations, because Storage Spaces operates on blocks and not files, and therefore some files may potentially lack necessary blocks or recovery data if part of the storage space is not working correctly. As a result, disk and data addition and removal may be impaired, and redundancy conversion becomes difficult or impossible.
 Windows Store cannot install apps on a ReFS volume.

Server 2016 updates 
At the Storage Developer Conference 2015, a Microsoft developer presented enhancements of ReFS expected to be released with Windows Server 2016 and included in Technical Preview 4, titled "ReFS v2". It highlighted that ReFS now included capabilities for very high speed moving, reordering, and cloning of blocks between files (which can be done for all blocks of a file). This is particularly needed for virtualization, and is stated to allow fast provisioning, diff merging, and tiering. Other enhancements cover the redo log (for synchronous disk writes), parallelization, efficient tracking of uninitialized sparse data and files, and efficient 4k I/O.

Server 2022 updates 
Windows Server 2022 (using ReFS version 3.7) supports file-level snapshots.

Windows Insider Preview 22H2 and 23H2 (builds 226** and 25***) support ReFS volume compression using LZ4 and zstd algorithms.

Performance and competitor comparisons 
Other operating systems have competing file systems to ReFS, of which the best known are ZFS and Btrfs, in the sense that all three are designed to integrate data protection, snapshots, and silent high-speed background healing of corruption and data errors.

In 2012, Phoronix wrote an analysis of ReFS vs Btrfs, a copy-on-write file system for Linux. Their features are similar, with both supporting checksums, RAID-like use of multiple disks, and error detection/correction. However, ReFS lacks copy-on-write snapshots and compression, both found in Btrfs and ZFS.

In 2014, a review of ReFS and assessment of its readiness for production use concluded that ReFS had at least some advantages over two of its main file system competitors.

 ZFS (used in Solaris, illumos, FreeBSD and others) was widely criticized for its comparatively extreme memory requirements of many gigabytes of RAM for online deduplication. However, online deduplication is never enabled by default in ZFS and was not supported at the time by ReFS (it has since been added), so not enabling ZFS online deduplication yielded a more even comparison between the two file systems as ZFS then has a memory requirement of only a few hundred megabytes.
 Offerings such as Drobo used proprietary methods which have no fallback if the company behind them fails.

Reverse engineering and internals 
, Microsoft has not published any specifications for ReFS, nor have any working open-source drivers been made. A third-party open-source project to document ReFS is on GitHub.

Paragon Software Group provides a closed-source driver for Windows and Linux.

See also 
 Comparison of file systems
 APFS
 WinFS

References

External links 
 Analysis of detailed differences between NTFS and ReFS in Server 2012, and reasons for choosing one or the other
 ReFS documentation project - PDF document of the ReFS filing system

2012 software
Windows disk file systems